King Gogugwon of Goguryeo (?–371, r. 331–371) was the 16th king of Goguryeo, the northernmost of the Three Kingdoms of Korea. He was the son of King Micheon and Lady Ju.

Goguryeo faced devastation by the Murong Xianbei people who attacked Goguryeo. Hwando was destroyed again by them in 341. Buyeo was also destroyed by the Xianbei in 346.

The reign of Gogukwon suffered severely from continuous foreign invasions, not only those of Chinese forces including Xianbei but also of Baekje, southernwest part of Korean peninsular. Particularly, the Xianbei state of Former Yan invaded the capital in 342, capturing Queen Ju, the mother of Gogukwon and his concubines and also digging up the corpse of his father, Micheon. Since the capital was thoroughly destroyed, Gogukwon firstly constructed Guknae seong as an alternative fortress in northern sphere and  temporarily moved the capital to Pyongyang, present-day capital of North Korea. While he could get back the corpse of his father, it took about 13 years for his mother to return to Goguryeo.

In 369, Gogukwon personally led expedition of more than 20,000 troops. Without success,  Geunchogo's son Geungusu overtook, counterattacked and killed Gogugwon in battle, at Pyongyang Castle, the only ruler of Goguryeo to die on a battlefield. He was buried in Gogugwon.

Family
Father: King Micheon (미천왕, 美川王)
Grandfather: Prince Dolgo (돌고, 咄固)
Mother: Queen, of the Ju clan (왕후 주씨, 王后 周氏)
Wife: unknown queen
Son: Prince Gubu (구부, 丘夫)
Son: Prince Iryeon (이련, 伊連)

Depiction in arts and media
 Portrayed by Lee Jong-won in the 2010–2011 KBS1 TV series The King of Legend.
Portrayed in 2017 KBS TV series Chronicles of Korea.

See also
History of Korea
Three Kingdoms of Korea
List of Korean monarchs
Goguryeo-Yan Wars

References

Goguryeo rulers
371 deaths
4th-century monarchs in Asia
Year of birth unknown
4th-century Korean people